In mathematics, unscented optimal control combines the notion of the unscented transform with deterministic optimal control to address a class of uncertain optimal control problems. It is a specific application of Riemmann-Stieltjes optimal control theory, a concept introduced by Ross and his coworkers.

Mathematical description 
Suppose that the initial state  of a dynamical system,

is an uncertain quantity.  Let  be the sigma points.  Then sigma-copies of the dynamical system are given by,

Applying standard deterministic optimal control principles to this ensemble generates an unscented optimal control. Unscented optimal control is a special case of tychastic optimal control theory.  According to Aubin and Ross, tychastic processes differ from stochastic processes in that a tychastic process is conditionally deterministic.

Applications 
Unscented optimal control theory has been applied to UAV guidance, spacecraft attitude control, air-traffic control and low-thrust trajectory optimization

References 

Optimal control